The 66th Annual Tony Awards was held on June 10, 2012, to recognize achievement in Broadway productions during the 2011–2012 season. The ceremony was held at the Beacon Theatre, and was broadcast live on CBS television, with  Neil Patrick Harris as the host.

Eligibility
Shows that opened on Broadway during the 2011–12 season before April 27, 2012 are eligible.

Original plays
Chinglish
Clybourne Park
The Columnist
End of the Rainbow
The Lyons
Magic/Bird
The Mountaintop
One Man, Two Guvnors
Other Desert Cities
Peter and the Starcatcher
Relatively Speaking
Seminar
Stick Fly
Venus in Fur

Original musicals
Bonnie & Clyde
Ghost the Musical
Leap of Faith
Lysistrata Jones
Newsies
Nice Work If You Can Get It
Once
Spider-Man Turn Off The Dark

Play revivals
Arthur Miller's Death of A Salesman
Don't Dress for Dinner
Gore Vidal's The Best Man
Man and Boy
Master Class
Private Lives
The Road to Mecca
A Streetcar Named Desire
Wit

Musical revivals
Evita
Follies
The Gershwins' Porgy & Bess
Godspell
Jesus Christ Superstar
On A Clear Day You Can See Forever

Ceremony
Neil Patrick Harris was the host of the ceremony. This marked the third time that Harris hosted the Tony Awards show.

The telecast had 6.01 million viewers (preliminary numbers), in contrast to the 2011 Tony Awards telecast, which had 6.950 million viewers.

Performances
There were performances from musicals including Evita featuring Ricky Martin and Elena Roger, Follies, with Danny Burstein singing "Buddy's Blues" and introduced by Bernadette Peters, Ghost the Musical, Godspell, Hairspray (from a production on a Royal Caribbean ship), Jesus Christ Superstar, Leap of Faith with Raúl Esparza and company, Newsies featuring Jeremy Jordan and company, Nice Work If You Can Get It with Kelli O'Hara, Matthew Broderick and company, Once featuring Steve Kazee and company, and The Gershwins' Porgy and Bess featuring Audra McDonald and Norm Lewis.  There also were performances from Tony-nominated plays, including End of the Rainbow with Tracie Bennett, One Man, Two Guvnors with James Corden, and Peter and the Starcatcher, with Christian Borle, Celia Keenan-Bolger and Adam Chanler-Berat.

The Book of Mormon cast members, along with Harris, started the show by singing a version of "Hello". The original musical number that opened the show had Harris singing and dancing to "What If Life Were More Like Theatre?" with Patti LuPone, Amanda Seyfried, Jesse Tyler Ferguson, and company. The closing musical number was "If I Had Time," sung by Harris. Both the opening and closing musical numbers were written by David Javerbaum and Adam Schlesinger.

Presenters
As announced on June 1, Angela Lansbury, Candice Bergen, Jessica Chastain, Jim Parsons, Christopher Plummer, Tyler Perry, Nick Jonas, Amanda Seyfried, Paul Rudd, Ellen Barkin, Bernadette Peters, James Marsden, Mandy Patinkin, and Sheryl Crow, among others, were presenters. On June 7, Matthew Morrison, Josh Groban, and Cote de Pablo were added to the presenter line-up. Other presenters included Patti LuPone, Trey Parker and Matt Stone.

Creative Arts awards
Several awards, named the "Creative Arts" awards, were presented prior to the main televised ceremony as well as during breaks. These included awards for: Best Lighting Design of a Play, Best Lighting Design of a Musical, Best Sound Design of a Play, Best Sound Design of a Musical, Best Costume Design of a Play, Best Costume Design of a Musical, Best Orchestrations, Best Scenic Design of a Play, Best Scenic Design of a Musical and Best Choreography. These awards were announced by Norbert Leo Butz and Beth Leavel.

Nominees and winners
The nominees were announced on May 1, 2012. The winners were announced on June 10, 2012.

Multiple nominations
11: Once
10: Nice Work If You Can Get It, Porgy and Bess
9: Peter and the Starcatcher 
8: Follies, Newsies 
7: Death of a Salesman, One Man, Two Guvnors 
5: Other Desert Cities
4: Clybourne Park 
3: Evita, End of the Rainbow, Ghost the Musical
2: Venus in Fur, Spider-Man: Turn Off the Dark, Jesus Christ Superstar, Wit, The Best Man, Bonnie & Clyde, Don't Dress for Dinner

Multiple wins
8: Once
5: Peter and the Starcatcher 
2: Death of a Salesman, Newsies, Nice Work If You Can Get It, Porgy and Bess

Non-competitive awards
The Tony Award for Excellence in the Theatre has been awarded to Freddie Gershon, Artie Siccardi and the TDF Open Doors Program. Those awards were presented at the Tony Eve Cocktail party, held on June 9, 2012 at the InterContinental Hotel (Times Square). The Special Tony Award for Lifetime Achievement in the Theatre has been awarded to Emanuel Azenberg. Bernadette Peters was presented with the Isabelle Stevenson Award and Special Tony Awards were given to Hugh Jackman and the Actors’ Equity Association. The Regional Theatre Tony Award has been awarded to the Shakespeare Theatre Company.

In Memoriam

Davy Jones
Stephen Douglass
Anna Massey
John Wood
Tom Aldredge
Eiko Ishioka
Theodore Mann 
Price Berkley
Ulu Grosbard
Diane Cilento
Dick Anthony Williams
Tony Stevens
Harry Morgan
Mary Fickett
Alice Playten
Patricia Neway 
Jeffrey Ash
Howard Kissel
Shelagh Delaney
Ray Aghayan
Margaret Tyzack 
William Duell
Philip Rose
Judd Woldin
Donald Grody
Ben Gazzara
Beatrice Terry
Liviu Ciulei
Donald Schoenbaum
Charles Jaffe
Berenice Weiler
Buddy Freitag
Jerry Leiber

See also
 Drama Desk Awards
 2012 Laurence Olivier Awards – equivalent awards for West End theatre productions
 Obie Award
 New York Drama Critics' Circle
 Theatre World Award
 Lucille Lortel Awards

References

External links
 Tony Awards Official Site

Tony Awards ceremonies
2012 theatre awards
2012 awards in the United States
2012 in New York City
2010s in Manhattan
Television shows directed by Glenn Weiss